

Wilhelm Adam (15 September 1877 – 8 April 1949) was a German general who served in the Bavarian Army, the Reichswehr and the Wehrmacht.

Adam was born in Ansbach, joining the German Army in 1897, and serving in Bavarian telegraph and Communication units before being detached to the Bavarian War Academy in 1907.

During World War I, Adam fought as a company leader of a Bavarian pioneer unit, but only for a short period. Towards the end of 1914, Adam became a General Staff Officer on the Staff of the Army High command. But right at the end of the war he was back to being a Bavarian engineer unit leader.  With the end of the war, Adam served in various posts within the Reichswehr, from posts such as a liaison officer to the Bavarian Military Ministry and being an infantry battalion commander, in the 20th Infantry Regiment.

By Hitler's rise to power in 1933, Adam was Chief of the Troop Office and soon was commanding a division and was also at the same time commanding Military District VII. Adam retired on 31 December 1938, but he was recalled for service from 26 August 1939. After several years of being at the disposal of the army he retired in 1943 and died in 1949 in Garmisch-Partenkirchen.

Memoir
Adam's unpublished memoir was preserved for many years after the war in a Bavarian monastery. It is now in the Institute of Contemporary History archives in Munich as file ED109/2.

Promotions
Fahnrich (25 January 1898)
Leutnant (10 March 1899)
Oberleutnant (28 October 1905)
Hauptmann (1 October 1911)
Major (14 December 1917)
Oberstleutnant (1 February 1923)
Oberst (1 February 1927)
Generalmajor (1 February 1930)
Generalleutnant (1 December 1931)
General der Infanterie (1 April 1935)
Generaloberst (1 January 1939)

Awards and decorations
 Iron Cross of 1914
 Prince Regent Luitpold Medal
 Military Merit Order, 3rd class with swords (Bavaria)
 Knight's Cross 2nd Class of the Albert Order with swords

Literature

 Hackl, Othmar: Die Bayerische Kriegsakademie (1867–1914). C.H. Beck´sche Verlagsbuchhandlung, München 1989, p. 393.
 Stahl, Friedrich-Christian: Generaloberst Wilhelm Adam. In: Gerd R. Ueberschär (Hrsg.): Hitlers militärische Elite. 68 Lebensläufe. Wissenschaftliche Buchgesellschaft, Darmstadt 2011, p. 1–8.
 Heuer, Gerd F.: Die Generalobersten des Heeres. Inhaber höchster deutscher Kommandostellen. Moewig, Rastatt 1988, p. 1–8.

References

1877 births
1949 deaths
People from Ansbach
People from the Kingdom of Bavaria
Colonel generals of the German Army (Wehrmacht)
Military personnel from Bavaria
German Army generals of World War II
Lieutenant generals of the Reichswehr
German memoirists
Recipients of the Iron Cross (1914), 1st class
German male non-fiction writers